The 1991–92 OB I bajnokság season was the 55th season of the OB I bajnokság, the top level of ice hockey in Hungary. Six teams participated in the league, and Ferencvarosi TC won the championship.

Regular season

Playoffs

5th place 
 Nepstadion NSzE Budapest - Miskolci HC 6:10

3rd place 
 Lehel SE Jászberény - Alba Volán Székesfehérvár 3:1

Final 
 Ferencvárosi TC - Újpesti TE 4:3 OT

External links
 Season on hockeyarchives.info

1991-92
Hun
OB